LANSA can mean:
 Líneas Aéreas Nacionales S. A. (Peru), a former airline better known by its acronym LANSA
 LANSA (development environment), a software development environment